Sylvinna Kurniawan (born 5 May 1988) is an Indonesian-born badminton player, and now representing Australia. She was part of Australia team that won the women's team title at the 2020 Oceania Championships.

Achievements

Oceania Championships 
Women's singles

Women's doubles

Mixed doubles

BWF International Challenge/Series (3 runners-up) 
Women's doubles

Mixed doubles

  BWF International Challenge tournament
  BWF International Series tournament
  BWF Future Series tournament

References

External links 
 

1988 births
Living people
Sportspeople from Surabaya
Indonesian female badminton players
Australian female badminton players
Indonesian emigrants to Australia
Sportswomen from New South Wales